Douglas George Rombough (July 8, 1950 – June 20, 2015) was a Canadian professional ice hockey centre.  He was drafted in the eighth round, 97th overall, by the Buffalo Sabres in the 1970 NHL Amateur Draft. He played in the National Hockey League with the Sabres, New York Islanders, and Minnesota North Stars between 1973 and 1975. Rombaugh was born in Fergus, Ontario and raised in Fort Erie, Ontario.

In his NHL career, Rombough appeared in 150 games. He scored twenty-four goals and added twenty-seven assists.

On June 20, 2015, Rombough died In the hospital in Plantation, Florida. He was the brother of Lorne Rombough, who played briefly in the WHA.

Career statistics

Regular season and playoffs

References

External links
 

1950 births
2015 deaths
Buffalo Sabres draft picks
Buffalo Sabres players
Canadian ice hockey centres
Cincinnati Swords players
Dallas Black Hawks players
Flint Generals (IHL) players
Fort Worth Texans players
Ice hockey people from Ontario
Minnesota North Stars players
New Haven Nighthawks players
New York Islanders players
People from Centre Wellington
St. Catharines Black Hawks players
Sportspeople from Fort Erie, Ontario